Mark Bright (born 1962) is an English footballer and sports pundit.

Mark Bright may also refer to:
 Mark Bright (record producer) (born 1959), American country music producer and songwriter
 Mark Bright (rugby union) (born 1978), New Zealand-born rugby union player
 M. D. Bright (born 1955), American comic book and storyboard artist
 March Bright, a fictional character in the soap opera Coronation Street